Mirliton, Flügelmütze, or Flügelkappe was a tall hat worn by hussars, light cavalrymen, and light infantrymen in the period 1750–1800, remaining in increasingly rare usage through the German Wars of Unification.

References

Military hats
History of clothing (Western fashion)